Gitugu is a settlement in Kenya's Central Province.

Many people living there are tea farmer and animals keeping.There are several schools located in the are, they include Gitugu secondary school Gitugu primary school

References 

Economy: most of the people live there are tea farmer and animals keeping

Populated places in Central Province (Kenya)